Burgers Pass, also known as Koo Pass, is situated in the Western Cape province of South Africa, on the Regional road R318 between Montagu and Touws River.

External links 
 Passes Index at Wild Dog Adventure Riding website

Mountain passes of the Western Cape